Miguel Maria Mariano Falé (born 28 January 2004) is a Portuguese professional footballer who plays as a forward for the Portuguese club Braga.

Professional career
Falé is a youth product of Benfica, and Lusitano G.C. before joining Braga's youth academy in 2018. He started training with their first team in 2021. He made his professional debut for Braga as a late sub in a 6–0 Primeira Liga win over Arouca on 30 December 2021.

International career
Falé is a youth international for Portugal, having represented the Portugal U16s, and U18s.

References

External links
 
 

2004 births
Living people
Portuguese footballers
Portugal youth international footballers
S.C. Braga players
Primeira Liga players
Association football forwards
Sportspeople from Évora District